Identical is a stage musical with music by George Stiles, lyrics by Anthony Drewe and a book by Stuart Paterson. It is based on the 1949 novel Lisa and Lottie by Erich Kästner (which also became the basis for many adaptations including Disney's The Parent Trap-film series which began with a 1961 film).

Plot 
As with the novel, the musical follows the story of twin girls who were separated at birth who meet at summer camp ten years later before swapping places to reunite with their parents and live each other's lives.

Production 
The musical was due to have its world premiere at the Nottingham Playhouse before transferring to the Theatre Royal, Bath over the summer of 2020. However, due to the 2019–20 coronavirus pandemic in the United Kingdom, the production was delayed until 2022, playing at the Nottingham Playhouse from 26 July until 14 August before transferring to The Lowry, Salford from 19 August until 3 September.

This production was directed by Sir Trevor Nunn and produced by Kenny Wax & Nottingham Playhouse.

Casts

Original cast

References

External links 
 Official website

Musicals based on novels
British musicals
2022 musicals